StarDance: Search for the Dance Idols is a Philippine reality dance television show on ABS-CBN. It aired from February 19 to May 21, 2005, and was replaced by My Juan and Only.

Hosts
Main hosts
 Marvin Agustin
 Vanessa Del Bianco

Co-hosts
 Bianca Gonzalez
 JC Cuadrado
 Archie Alemania

Contestants

Elimination
In every Saturday all dancers will perform according to the dance theme with a factor like dancing in the sea or dancing while standing in a thin pole then the judges gonna choose the bottom dancers which the judges did not like the performance and after the bottom dancers must perform with the factors used in the challenge to change there low scores. The lowest bottom dancer is eliminated with the score and public votes.

External links
 

Philippine reality television series
2005 Philippine television series debuts
2005 Philippine television series endings
ABS-CBN original programming
Filipino-language television shows